Chacraraju or Chakraraju (possibly from Quechua chakra little farm; field, land sown with seed, rahu snow, ice, mountain with snow) is a mountain in the Cordillera Blanca range in the Andes of Peru. The mountain has two distinctive peaks: Chacraraju Oeste (west summit) and Chacraraju Este (east summit). Chacraraju is located in Huaylas Province, Ancash; south and southeast of Pirámide and east of Lake Parón. The peak is accessible from the Pisco base camp at Cebollapampa.

Chacraraju is considered the steepest and the most difficult-to-climb six-thousander in the Andes. A French expedition led by Lionel Terray first climbed the mountain on 31 July 1956 (Chakrarahu Oeste) and on 5 August 1962 (Chakrarahu Este) using what have since become the normal routes (northeast face and northeast ridge). Greg Mortimer was badly injured during a later attempt to climb the mountain.

See also 
 Sentilo

References

Mountains of Peru
Mountains of Ancash Region
Six-thousanders of the Andes